Shekhinah, also spelled Shechinah (Hebrew: שְׁכִינָה Šəḵīnā, Tiberian: Šăḵīnā) is the English transliteration of a Hebrew word meaning "dwelling" or "settling" and denotes the presence of God, as it were, in a place. This concept is found in Judaism.

The Hebrew Bible mentions several places where the presence of God was felt and experienced as a Shekhinah, including the burning bush and the cloud that rested on Mount Sinai. The Shekhinah was often pictured as a cloud or as a pillar of fire and was referred to as the glory of God. The Shekhinah was also understood to be present in the Tabernacle and the Temple in Jerusalem, and to be seated at the right hand of God.

The word shekhinah is not found in the Bible and is Talmud and Midrash, though not in the Mishnah.

Etymology
The word shekhinah is first encountered in the rabbinic literature.  

The Semitic root from which shekhinah is derived, š-k-n, means "to settle, inhabit, or dwell". In the verb form, it is often used to refer to the dwelling of a person or animal in a place, or to the dwelling of God. Nouns derived from the root included shachen ("neighbor") and mishkan (a dwelling-place, whether a secular home or a holy site such as the Tabernacle).

In Judaism
In classic Jewish thought, the shekhinah refers to a dwelling or settling in a special sense, a dwelling or settling of divine presence, to the effect that, while in proximity to the shekhinah, the connection to God is more readily perceivable.

While shekhinah is a feminine word in Hebrew, it primarily seems to be featured in masculine or androgynous contexts referring to a divine manifestation of the presence of God, based especially on readings of the Talmud.

Manifestation
The prophets made numerous references to visions of the presence of God, particularly in the context of the Tabernacle or Temple, with figures such as thrones or robes filling the Sanctuary. These visions have traditionally been attributed to the presence of the shekhinah.

The shekhinah is referred to as manifest in the Tabernacle and the Temple in Jerusalem throughout rabbinic literature. 

It is also reported as being present in other contexts:
 While a person (or people) study Torah, the Shekhinah is among them.
 "Whenever ten are gathered for prayer, there the Shekhinah rests."
 "When three sit as judges, the Shekhinah is with them."
 Cases of personal need: "The Shekhinah dwells over the headside of the sick man's bed", "Wheresoever they were exiled, the Shekhinah went with them."
 "A man and woman - if they merit, the Shekhinah is between them. If not, fire consumes them." According to one interpretation of this source, the Shekhinah is the highest of six types of holy fire. When a married couple is worthy of this manifestation, all other types of fire are consumed by it.

The Talmud states that "the Shekhinah rests on man neither through gloom, nor through sloth, nor through frivolity, nor through levity, nor through talk, nor through idle chatter, but only through a matter of joy in connection with a mitzvah."

There is no occurrence of the word "shekhinah" in pre-rabbinic literature such as the Dead Sea Scrolls.  It is only afterwards in the targums and rabbinic literature that the Hebrew term shekhinah, or Aramaic equivalent shekinta, is found, and then becomes extremely common. Martin McNamara (see notes) considers that the absence might lead to the conclusion that the term only originated after the destruction of the temple in 70 CE, but notes 2 Maccabees 14:35 "a temple for your habitation", where the Greek text suggests a possible parallel understanding, and where σκήνωσις skēnōsis "a tent-building", a variation on an early loanword from Phoenician ( skēnē "tent"), is deliberately used to represent the original Hebrew or Aramaic term.

Targum
In the Targum the addition of the noun term shekhinah paraphrases Hebrew verb phrases such as Exodus 34:9 "let the Lord go among us" (a verbal expression of presence) which Targum paraphrases with God's "shekhinah" (a noun form). In the post-temple era usage of the term shekhinah may provide a solution to the problem of God being omnipresent and thus not dwelling in any one place.  In the Hebrew text of Exodus 33:20, as another example, Moses is told "You will not be able to see my face, for no human can see Me and live."  Once again, using of the term shekhinah provides a solution to the corporeal idiom, so Targum Onkelos reads:  "You will not be able to see the face of my shekhinah...."

Jewish prayers
The 17th blessing of the daily Amidah prayer concludes with the line "[Blessed are You, God,] who returns His Presence (shekhinato) to Zion".

The Liberal Jewish prayer-book for Rosh Hashanah and Yom Kippur (Machzor Ruach Chadashah) contains a creative prayer based on Avinu Malkeinu, in which the feminine noun shekhinah is used in the interests of gender neutrality.

Relationship to the Holy Spirit
The concept of shekhinah is also associated with the concept of the Holy Spirit in Judaism (ruach ha-kodesh).

Kabbalah

Sabbath Bride
The theme of the shekhinah as the Sabbath Bride recurs in the writings and songs of 16th century Kabbalist, Isaac Luria. The Asader Bishvachin song, written in Aramaic by Luria (his name appears as an acrostic of each line) and sung at the evening meal of Shabbat is an example of this. The song appears in particular in many siddurs in the section following Friday night prayers and in some Shabbat song books:
Let us invite the Shechinah with a newly-laid table
and with a well-lit menorah that casts light on all heads.

Three preceding days to the right, three succeeding days to the left,
and amid them the Sabbath bride with adornments she goes, vessels and robes
...
May the Shechinah become a crown through the six loaves on each side 
through the doubled-six may our table be bound with the profound Temple services

A paragraph in the Zohar starts: "One must prepare a comfortable seat with several cushions and embroidered covers, from all that is found in the house, like one who prepares a canopy for a bride. For the Shabbat is a queen and a bride. This is why the masters of the Mishna used to go out on the eve of Shabbat to receive her on the road, and used to say: "'Come, O bride, come, O bride!' And one must sing and rejoice at the table in her honor ... one must receive the Lady with many lighted candles, many enjoyments, beautiful clothes, and a house embellished with many fine appointments ..."

The tradition of the shekhinah as the Shabbat Bride, the Shabbat Kallah, continues to this day.

As feminine aspect
Kabbalah associates the shekhinah with the female. According to Gershom Scholem, "The introduction of this idea was one of the most important and lasting innovations of Kabbalism. ...no other element of Kabbalism won such a degree of popular approval." The "feminine Jewish divine presence, the shekhinah, distinguishes Kabbalistic literature from earlier Jewish literature."
"In the imagery of the Kabbalah the shekhinah is the most overtly female sefirah, the last of the ten sefirot, referred to imaginatively as 'the daughter of God'. ... The harmonious relationship between the female shekhinah and the six sefirot which precede her causes the world itself to be sustained by the flow of divine energy. She is like the moon reflecting the divine light into the world."

Nativity and life of Moses
The Zohar, a foundation book of kabbalah, presents the shekhinah as playing an essential role in the conception and birth of Moses. Later during the Exodus on the "third new moon" in the desert, "Shekhinah revealed Herself and rested upon him before the eyes of all."

The Tenth Sefirah
In Kabbalah, the shekhinah is identified with the tenth sefirah (Malkuth), and the source of life for humans on earth below the sefirotic realm. The Shekhinah is seen as the feminine divine presence of God descended in this world, dwelling with the people of Israel and sharing in their struggles. Moses is the only human considered to have risen beyond shekhinah into the sefirotic realm, reaching the level of Tiferet, or the bridegroom of the shekhinah.

In Christianity
The concept is similar to that in the Gospel of Matthew 18:20, "Where two or three are gathered together in my name there am I in their midst." Some Christian theologians have connected the concept of shekhinah to the Greek term parousia, "presence" or "arrival," which is used in the New Testament in a similar way for "divine presence".

Shekinah Youth Retreat Training Course, Ireland
Supported by the Roman Catholic Salesian order, Shekinah was founded to support and provide training for those providing retreats for young people. Initially, it was based in All Hallows College, Dublin, the training programmes gained accreditation from St. Patrick's College, Maynooth (Pontifical University), first the certificate course was developed in 2014 and in 2016 the Level 7 - Diploma in Spirituality  (Applied Youth Ministry and Facilitation) course. The course is delivered online over the course of a year.

Branch Davidians
Lois Roden, whom the original Branch Davidian Seventh-Day Adventist Church acknowledged as their teacher/prophet from 1978 to 1986, laid heavy emphasis on women's spirituality and the feminine aspect of God. She published a magazine, Shekinah, often rendered SHEkinah, in which she explored the concept that the shekhinah is the Holy Spirit. Articles from Shekinah are reprinted online at the Branch Davidian website.

In Islam

In the Quran
Sakīnah signifies the "presence or peace of God". As "support and reassurance" it was "sent by God into the hearts" of Muslims and Muhammad, according to John Esposito. A modern translator of the Quran, N. J. Dawood, states that "tranquility" is the English word for the Arabic meaning of sakīnah, yet it could be "an echo of the Hebrew shekeenah (the Holy Presence)." Another scholar states that the Arabic sakīnah derives from the Hebrew/Aramaic shekhinah. In the Quran, the Sakīnah is mentioned six times, in surat al-Baqara, at-Tawba and al-Fath. 

Sakīnah means "tranquility", "peace". "calm", from the Arabic root sakana: "to be quiet", "to abate", "to dwell". In Islam, Sakīnah "designates a special peace, the "Peace of God". Although related to Hebrew shekhinah, the spiritual state is not an "indwelling of the Divine Presence" The ordinary Arabic use of the word's root is "the sense of abiding or dwelling in a place". A story in Tafsir and Isra'iliyyat literature relates how Ibrahim and Isma'il, when looking for the spot to build the Kaaba found sakīnah. Newby writes that it was like a breeze "with a face that could talk", saying "build over me." "Associated with piety and moments of divine inspiration, sakinah in Islamic mysticism signifies an interior spiritual illumination."

Comments regarding Sakina
Sakina in the Quran can refer to God's blessing of solace and succour upon both the Children of Israel and Muhammad. Al-Qurtubi mentions in his exegesis, in explanation of the above-mentioned verse [2:248], that according to Wahb ibn Munabbih, sakinah is a spirit from God that speaks, and, in the case of the Israelites, where people disagreed on some issue, this spirit came to clarify the situation, and used to be a cause of victory for them in wars. According to Ali, "Sakinah is a sweet breeze/wind, whose face is like the face of a human". Mujahid mentions that "when Sakinah glanced at an enemy, they were defeated", and ibn Atiyyah mentions about the Ark of the Covenant (at-Tabut), to which the sakina was associated, that souls found therein peace, warmth, companionship and strength.

In Gnosticism

Shekhinah, often in plural, is also present in some gnostic writings written in Aramaic, such as the writings of the Manichaeans and the Mandaeans, as well as others. In these writings, shekinas are described as hidden aspects of God, somewhat resembling the Amahrāspandan of the Zoroastrians.

In Mandaeism, a škina is a celestial dwelling where uthra, or benevolent celestial beings, live in the World of Light (alma d-nhūra). In Mandaean priest initiation ceremonies, a škina refers to an initiation hut where a novice and his initiator stay for seven days without sleeping. The hut is called a škina since priests are considered to be the earthly manifestations of uthras, and the initiation hut represents the abode of the uthra on earth.

Anthropological views

Raphael Patai
In the work by anthropologist Raphael Patai entitled The Hebrew Goddess, the author argues that the term shekhinah refers to a goddess by comparing and contrasting scriptural and medieval Jewish Kabbalistic source materials. Patai draws a historic distinction between the shekhinah and the Matronit. In his book Patai also discusses the Hebrew goddesses Asherah and Anat-Yahu.

Gustav Davidson
American poet Gustav Davidson listed shekhinah as an entry in his reference work A Dictionary of Angels, Including the Fallen Angels (1967), stating that she is the female incarnation of Metatron.

See also
 Andiruna in Mandaeism
 Elohim
 Maid of Heaven
 Genius loci
 The Hebrew Goddess
 Holy Spirit in Judaism
 Numen
 Priestly Blessing
 Shakti in Hinduism
 Shkinta in Mandaeism
 Sophia in Gnosticism
 Theophany
 Yahweh

References

External links
 Jewish Encyclopedia (1906).
 "Who Is Shechinah and What Does She Want From My Life?", Chabad.
 Autiot of the Shekinah
 The Shekhinah in Judaism
 Article about the Matronit/Maggid as an aspect of the Shekinah

Hebrew words and phrases
Jewish theology
Kabbalah
Kabbalistic words and phrases